The yellowish pipit (Anthus chii) is a species of bird in the family Motacillidae.
It is found in Argentina, Bolivia, Brazil, Chile, Colombia, French Guiana, Guyana, Panama, Paraguay, Peru, Suriname, Uruguay, and Venezuela.
Its natural habitats are temperate grassland, subtropical or tropical seasonally wet or flooded lowland grassland, and pastureland.

Prior to 2022, its scientific name was Anthus lutescens, but based on a 2021 study, the International Ornithological Congress renamed it to Anthus chii, the name by which Louis Jean Pierre Vieillot described this species in 1818, which has precedence over the name Anthus lutescens.

References

Further reading

Anthus
Birds of South America
Birds described in 1818
Taxa named by Louis Jean Pierre Vieillot
Taxonomy articles created by Polbot